Alfred Karl Gabriel Jeremias (24 February 1864 in Chemnitz, Kingdom of Saxony – 11 January 1935) was a German pastor, Assyriologist and an expert on the religions of the ancient Near East.

Life

In 1891 he published the first German translation of the Epic of Gilgamesh. From 1890 until his death he was pastor of the Lutheran congregation in Leipzig, and from 1922 he was also professor at Leipzig University. He  received honorary degrees in 1905 from Leipzig and in 1914 from the University of Groningen.

He was one of the prominent advocates of Panbabylonism, explaining the origins of the Hebrew Bible in terms of Babylonian mythology.

Literature

Publications 
Die Höllenfahrt der Istar. Eine altbabylon. Beschwörungslegende, Diss. phil. Leipzig; München 1886
Bemerkungen zu einigen assyr. Altertümern in den K. Museen zu Dresden, in: ZA 1, 1886, 45-50
Die Babylon.-assyr. Vorstellungen vom Leben nach dem Tode. Nach den Quellen mit Berücks. der alttestamentl. Parallelen dargest., Leipzig 1887
Izdubar-Nimrod. Eine altbabylon. Heldensage. Nach den Keilschriftfragmenten dargest., Leipzig 1891
Das Walten der Liebe in der Gemeinde. Predigt über Apostelgesch. 6,1-7, gehalten am 6. Sonntage nach Trinitatis in der Lutherkirche zu Leipzig, Leipzig 1891
Das ewige Licht geht da herein! Festpredigt, zum 50. Jahresfeste des student. Missionsvereins zu Halle a. d. Saale gehalten am III. Adventssonntage 1892 in der Laurentiuskirche, Leipzig 1892
Im Glauben klar! In Liebe wahr! In Hoffnung fröhlich immerdar! Festpredigt, bei dem 49. Jahresfest des Dresdner Hauptvereins der Gustav-Adolf-Stiftung am 12. Juli 1893 in Seifhennersdorf gehalten, Dresden 1893
Vom reichen Manne und armen Lazarus der menschl. Gesellschaft. Predigt, den 7. Juni 1893 in Frankfurt/M. gehalten, Karlsruhe 1893
Der Untergang Niniveh's und die Weissagungsschrift des Nahum von Elkosch [with Adolf Billerbeck], in: Beiträge zur Assyriologie 3, 1895, 88-188
Fürchtet Gott - Ehret den König!, Leipzig 1898
 Totenkultus bei den Babyloniern, in: Wissensch. Beilage zur Leipziger Ztg. 1899, Nr. 138 (
Hölle und Paradies bei den Babyloniern, Leipzig 1900; 2nd ed. Leipzig 1903
The Babylonian conception of heaven and hell, London 1902
Im Kampfe um Babel und Bibel. Ein Wort zur Verständigung und Abwehr, Leipzig 1902, 1903
 Babel-Bibel und Religionswissenschaft, in: Berliner Tageblatt. Zeitgeist Nr. 7, 1903
 Im Kriege um Babel und Bibel, in: AELKZ 36, 1903, 543-545
Das AT im Lichte des alten Orients. Handb. zur bibl.-orient. Altertumskunde, Leipzig 1904, English London/New York 1911, 4th ed. 1930.
Die Sprache der Sterne in der Babylon. und bibl. Vorstellungswelt, in: Berliner Tageblatt. Beil. Zeitgeist 1904, Nr. 21
 Babylonisches im Neuen Testament, Leipzig 1905
 Monotheistische Strömungen innerhalb der babylonischen Religion, Leipzig 1905
 Alter Orient und Alttestamentler, in: ThBl, 1905, 337–349; NT und Religionsgesch., in: Reformation 1905, Nr. 1
 Dormitio Sanctae Virginis, in: Illustr. Ztg. Leipzig, 19.4. 190
 Die Panbabylonisten, der Alte Orient und die ägypt. Religion, Leipzig 190
Der Einfluß Babyloniens auf das Verständnis des AT, Berlin 1908 (Bibl. Zeit- und Streitfragen 4,2)
Das Alter der babylonischen Astronomie, Leipzig 19082nd ed. Leipzig 1909
Die Zeitrechnung der biblischen Urgeschichte, in: Reformation 1908, Nr. 5
 Urim und Tummim. Ephod. Theraphim, in: Hilprecht Anniversary Volume, Leipzig 1909, 223-242
 Hat Jesus Christus gelebt? Prolegomena zu einer religionswissenschaftl. Unters. des Christusproblems, Leipzig 1911
 Kanaan in vorisraelit. Zeit, Berlin 1911
Handbuch der altorientischen Geisteskultur, Leipzig 1913
 Hugo Winckler. Gedächtnisrede, Mitteilungen der Vorderasiat. Gesellschaft 20,1, 1915, 1-12
 Christlicher und außerchristlicher Schicksalsglaube in Vergangenheit und Gegenwart, in: AELKZ 49, 1916, 754–758, 778-782 = Leipzig 1916
 Die sogenannten Kedorlaomer-Texte, in: Orient. Studien. FS Fritz Hommel I, Leipzig 1917, 69-97
Allgemeine Religions-Geschichte, München 1918
Denkschrift des Freien Arbeitsausschusses der sächs. ev.-luth. Landeskirche zur Mitarbeit bei der bevorstehenden kirchl. Neuordnung, hg. von Johs. Herz u. A. Jeremias, Leipzig o. J. [1918]
Unsere Toten leben!, Leipzig/Hamburg 1918; Die soz. Aufgabe der Kirche, Leipzig 1918 (Kirchl.-soz. Heft 59)
 Die Religion im neuen Staat, in: Illustr. Ztg., Leipzig 1919, Nr. 3955
 Babylische Dichtungen, Epen und Legenden, Leipzig 1925 (AO 25,1)
 Johannes von Staupitz, Luthers Vater und Schüler. Sein Leben, sein Verhältnis zu Luther und eine Auswahl aus seinen Schriften übertr. und hrsg., Sannerz/Leipzig 1926
 Buddhistische und theosophische Frömmigkeit, Leipzig 1927, 2nd ed.  1929
Jüdische Frömmigkeit, Leipzig 1927, 2nd ed.  1929
Die außerbiblische Erlösererwartung. Zeugnisse aller Jahrtausende in ihrer Einheitlichkeit dargest., Berlin 1927
Germanische Frömmigkeit, Leipzig 1928
 Leben im Kirchenjahr, 1928
 Johannes von Staupitz, Luthers Vater und Schüler, in: AELKZ 61, 1928, 368-391
 Der Babylonische Fixsternhimmel um 2000 v. Chr., in: Weltall 28, 1929, 73-75
 Die Weltanschauung der Sumerer, Leipzig 1929/30 (Der Alte Orient 27,4)
 Muhammedanische Frömmigkeit, Leipzig 1930
 Die Bedeutung des Mythos und [für] das apostolische Glaubensbekenntnis, Leipzig 1930
 Der Antichrist in Geschichte und Gegenwart, Leipzig 1930
 Panbabylonismus, in: RGG 2IV, 1930, 879 f.
 Die biblische Erlösererwartung, Berlin 193
 Der Schleier von Sumer bis heute, Leipzig 1931 (AO 31,1/2)
 Der Kosmos von Sumer, Leipzig 1932 (AO 32,1)
 Babylonische Dichtungen, Epen und Legenden, in: Anthropos 28, 1933, 790 ff.
 Evangelisches Christentum und Katholizismus. Antwort auf Karl Adam: Das Wesen des Katholizismus, Berlin 1933
 Die biblischen Urgeschichten in der Schule, in: ThBl 1935, 265-273
 Das Alte Testament im Lichte des Alten Orients, Leipzig,
 Handbuch der altorientalischen Geisteskultur, Berlin, 2nd ed. 1929

Obituaries 
 E. Weidner, Archiv für Orientforschung Bd. 10 (1935/36), S. 195f.
 W. Baumgartner, Zeitschrift für Assyriologie Bd. 43 (1936), S. 299–301.

External links 

1864 births
1935 deaths
People from Chemnitz
People from the Kingdom of Saxony
20th-century German Lutheran clergy
German Assyriologists
German male non-fiction writers
19th-century German Lutheran clergy